The Robin HR100 is a French four-seat light monoplane, designed by Chris Heintz and built by Avions Pierre Robin as metal-winged version of the Robin DR253 Regent.

Development

The prototype of the Robin HR100 was the prototype DR253 Regent which was rebuilt with metal wings and powered by a 180 hp (134 kW) Lycoming O-360 engine. It first flew on 3 April 1969 as the Robin HR100/180. The HR100 is a low-wing cantilever monoplane with a conventional cantilever tail unit and a fixed tricycle landing gear. A number of different variants were produced in the 1970s. From 1972 a high-powered improved version was produced as the HR100/285 with a 285 hp (213 kW) Continental Tiara 6-285B engine and retractable landing gear and airframe modifications.

The French Air Force ordered a number of HR.100/250 aircraft in the mid 1970s and these were used for communications and other duties.

A two-seat trainer version was developed as the HR200, and a modified version with a lighter airframe and new fin and rudder was developed as the R1180 Aiglon in 1977.

Variants
HR.100 Royal
1969 Prototype with a 180hp (134kW) Lycoming O-360 engine, one built.
HR.100/180
1976 Prototype with a 180hp (134kW) Lycoming O-360 engine, one built.
HR.100/200B Royal
Initial production version with a 200hp (149kW) Lycoming IO-360 engine.
HR.100/210 Safari
Production version with a 210hp (157kW) engine, 113 built of both 200B Royal and 210 Safari variants.
HR.100/235TR
Experimental HR.100 with an enlarged tail and retractable landing gear and a 235hp Lycoming O-540-B engine, one built.
HR.100/250TR 
HR.100/235 with a 250hp (186kW) Lycoming IO-540-C4B5 engine, 24 built.
HR.100/285TR Tiara
HR.100/235 with a 285hp (213kW) Continental Tiara 6-285 engine, 37 built
HR.100/320 4+2
Experimental version with two extra children's seats, one built

Operators

Military operators

French Air Force
French Navy

Specifications (HR.100/285)

See also

References

 The Illustrated Encyclopedia of Aircraft (Part Work 1982-1985), 1985, Orbis Publishing, Page 2799
 R.W.Simpson, Airlife's General Aviation, Airlife Publishing, England, 1991, 
 

1960s French civil utility aircraft
HR100
Aircraft first flown in 1969
Single-engined tractor aircraft
Low-wing aircraft